Jelena Ćetković (21 August 1916 – 14 May 1943) was a revolutionary, fighter for women’s rights, participant in the National Liberation Front, and National Hero of Yugoslavia.

Biography 

Ćetković was born on 21 August 1916 in Cetinje in the kingdom of Montenegro as the youngest child of Blagota and Gordana Ćetković. She had two elder brothers, Nikola and Đorđije. Shortly after her birth, the family moved to Podgorica and her father died from wounds sustained in the World War I.

After graduation, Ćetković enrolled in a women's crafts school where she learned tailoring crafts. As a young worker, she joined the worker movement. In 1933, she became a member of the Yugoslavian communal youth alliance and two years later, a member of the Yugoslavian communist party. She registered as a volunteer in the fight against fascism in Spain, but the police intercepted the volunteers and prevented their departure. Ćetković and her brother Đorđije were filed as communists by the police and because of this, they were often under surveillance, arrested and mistreated. They moved to Belgrade in 1938 where Ćetković continued her political activities. She was an instructor of the areal KPJ (Communal Party of Yugoslavia) committee for Serbia and was responsible for working with women.

At the beginning of World War II, Ćetković was in a partisan unit in Bosnia, then in the Republic of Užice, where she worked with women. At the end of 1941, she returned to Belgrade where she worked as the secretary of the local KPJ committee and organized numerous activities, sabotages and diversions. She was arrested in March 1942 while preparing to assassinate Đorđe Kosmajac. The assassination was successful while she was interrogated and tortured. She was transferred to Banjica concentration camp and was shot at Jajinci in May 1943.

Poem 
During her imprisonment at the camp, Ćetković wrote a poem entitled Behind Bars which was saved and published in The Voice of the Unique National Liberation Front of Serbia in January 1944.

Legacy 
Ćetković was declared a national hero on 5 May 1952. In the national theatre, a performance of „Jelena Ćetković“, produced by Boro Grigorović with inspiration from drama written by Aleksandar Petrović, was performed for twenty years. A television movie produced by Zdravko Šotra was also inspired by a drama with the same name. The movement to rescue Ivanka Muačević from the central state hospital the day after she gave birth inspired the episode Hospital, while the assassination attempt on Đorđe Kosmajac inspired the episode Traitor of the TV series Castaways.

The street of Jelena Ćetković is located in Belgrade in the Old City municipality. This street has borne her name since 1946. Adjacent to this street is the street of Kopitareva Gradina, one of the oldest urban areas in Belgrade which was formed at the beginning of the 20th century and whose characteristics remain today. This area has been declared a cultural heritage area because of its cultural and historical importance as a whole. The birth house of Jovan Cvijić, which was remade into his Memorial museum, can be found in this street at no. 5. Streets with this name also exist in Kragujevac, Kraljevo, Lazarevac, Niš (Mediana), Podgorica, Požarevac, Šid. Subotica and Vranje.

There is a school named after Jelena Ćetković in the Belgrade municipality of Zvezdara at Vranjska street no. 26. A bust of Ćetković by sculptor Dragutin Spasić stands in front of the school building. 

In 1984, the Yugoslav Post issued a stamp commemorating Jelena Ćetković.

References 

1916 births
1943 deaths
Military personnel from Cetinje
Yugoslav Partisans members
Recipients of the Order of the People's Hero
Women in the Yugoslav Partisans
Resistance members killed by Nazi Germany
People executed by Nazi Germany by firearm
People who died in Banjica concentration camp